Ornithogalum nutans, known as drooping star-of-Bethlehem, is a species of flowering plant in the family Asparagaceae, native to Europe and South West Asia. It is cultivated, and has naturalized, outside its native range, for example in North America. It has become extremely invasive along the Chesapeake and Ohio Canal in Maryland. At least in North America, it is not as common as Ornithogalum umbellatum.

The specific epithet nutans means "nodding", referring to the flowers' slightly drooping habit.

O. nutans is hardy to USDA Zones 6–10. It has gained the Royal Horticultural Society's Award of Garden Merit.

References 

nutans
Plants described in 1753
Taxa named by Carl Linnaeus